Annika Marie Wells (born February 16, 1996) is an American singer-songwriter from Sleepy Hollow, Marin County, California. Since moving to LA she has worked with BTS, The Jonas Brothers, Steve Aoki, PRETTYMUCH, ILLENIUM, Grey, Shawn Wasabi, Benjamin Ingrosso and others. She is a regular collaborator of Maggie Lindemann and AJ Mitchell and has worked with Hailee Steinfeld, The Chainsmokers, Whethan, Emily Warren, Social House, Lennon Stella, Kennedi, Sabrina Carpenter, Tove Styrke, Matoma, Freddy Wexler, and Jason Evigan.

Shortly after moving to Los Angeles, she wrote Illenium's single "Crawl Outta Love", which made the Top 30 on the Hot Dance/Electronic Charts and was awarded the grand prize at the International Songwriting Competition. In 2019 she performed her collaborations with Illenium on his arena tour. Her song which she co-wrote with Illenium entitled "Nightlight" reached No.1 at Dance Radio in November 2020.

Songwriting discography

References 

1996 births
Living people
American women singer-songwriters
21st-century American women